John Connolly (born 28 December 1971) is an Irish footballer who plays as a goalkeeper, most recently for NIFL Championship side Institute.

After playing as a schoolboy for Cherry Orchard Connolly signed for Bohemians in summer 1990 as cover for Dermot O'Neill. When O'Neill left for Derry City, John became first choice and was in goal when Bohs won the FAI Cup in 1992. He also had spells at Shelbourne, Wayside Celtic, Dundalk (where he won another FAI Cup in 2002), Newry City F.C. and Institute F.C.

International career
John played for the Republic of Ireland national football team at the 1991 FIFA World Youth Championship .

Honours
FAI Cup: 2
 Bohemians - 1992
 Dundalk - 2002
League of Ireland First Division: 1
 Dundalk - 2000/01

References

Republic of Ireland association footballers
League of Ireland players
Dundalk F.C. players
Shelbourne F.C. players
Bohemian F.C. players
Republic of Ireland under-21 international footballers
Newry City F.C. players
NIFL Premiership players
Living people
Association football goalkeepers
1971 births
Institute F.C. players
Cherry Orchard F.C. players
Wayside Celtic F.C. players
Portadown F.C. players